Eschweilera rimbachii is a species of woody plant in the family Lecythidaceae. It is found in Colombia and Ecuador.

References

rimbachii
Flora of Colombia
Flora of Ecuador
Vulnerable plants
Taxonomy articles created by Polbot